Dalling Field at Saint Joseph High School Field is a soccer facility located in Trumbull, Connecticut, within the Saint Joseph High School Athletic Complex.  It is the home of the Saint Joseph High School sports team, and Yankee Lady FC   of the Women's Premier Soccer League (WPSL).

References

External links
 Dalling Field at Saint Joseph High School Field

Buildings and structures in Trumbull, Connecticut
Sports venues in Fairfield County, Connecticut
Soccer venues in Connecticut